Pablo Andrés Brenes Quesada (born 4 August 1982) is a Costa Rican soccer player.

Club career
Brenes' first team in MLS was the MetroStars, whom he joined from Pérez Zeledón in Costa Rica, signing with the team on June 4, 2004.  He finished the year with no goals or assists in 14 games. Brenes was then taken by Real Salt Lake in the 2004 MLS Expansion Draft, but never played a game with the team. He was traded to Saprissa for Douglas Sequeira (who was then sent to Chivas USA).

With Saprissa, he has won a national championship and a CONCACAF Champions Cup, and was part of the team that played the 2005 FIFA Club World Championship Toyota Cup, where Saprissa finished third behind São Paulo and Liverpool. In 2008, he joined Brujas.

In summer 2011, Brenes signed a three short tournament and debuted in the tie against Alajuelense, scoring the team's goal. He was released by Cartaginés in May 2013.

He was later released by his new club Santos de Guápiles in November 2013.

International career
Brenes was a fixture for the Under-23 Costa Rica national football team, and played a major role in the team's run in the 2004 Summer Olympics, impressing many observers.

He made his senior debut for Costa Rica in a June 2005 friendly match against China and has earned a total of 11 caps, scoring no goals. He has represented his country in 3 FIFA World Cup qualification matches and played at the 2009 UNCAF Nations Cup as well as at the 2009 CONCACAF Gold Cup where he played his final international in July 2009 against Mexico.

Career statistics

References

External links

1982 births
Living people
Association football midfielders
Costa Rican footballers
Costa Rica international footballers
Footballers at the 2004 Summer Olympics
Olympic footballers of Costa Rica
2009 UNCAF Nations Cup players
2009 CONCACAF Gold Cup players
Municipal Pérez Zeledón footballers
New York Red Bulls players
Deportivo Saprissa players
Brujas FC players
C.S. Cartaginés players
Santos de Guápiles footballers
Costa Rican expatriate footballers
Expatriate soccer players in the United States
Major League Soccer players
Real Salt Lake players